John Laughlin (March 14, 1856 – August 4, 1905) was an American politician from New York.

Life
John Laughlin was born in Newstead, New York on March 14, 1856. He attended the district schools, and Lockport Union School from 1874 to 1878. Then he studied law with Richard Crowley, was admitted to the bar in 1880, and practiced in Buffalo.

He was a member of the New York State Senate (31st D.) from 1888 to 1891, sitting in the 111th, 112th, 113th and 114th New York State Legislatures. He was a delegate to the 1888 Republican National Convention.

He died suddenly on August 4, 1905, in his apartment at the Lenox Hotel in Buffalo, of "apoplexy".

Sources

 The New York Red Book compiled by Edgar L. Murlin (published by James B. Lyon, Albany NY, 1897; pg. 403)
 Biographical sketches of the members of the Legislature in The Evening Journal Almanac (1891)

1856 births
1905 deaths
Republican Party New York (state) state senators
Politicians from Buffalo, New York
19th-century American politicians